Beginning 2010, Emmental-Oberaargau is one of five administrative divisions (regions) of the canton of Berne. It comprises the two former districts of 
Emmental and Oberaargau. It has a population of 168'000 (2005 estimate) in 89 municipalities, comprising 1021.32 km2.

Regions of the canton of Bern